Euophrys monadnock is a species of jumping spider which occurs in the United States and Canada. It was first described by James Henry Emerton in 1891.

References

External links

Euophrys monadnock at Worldwide database of jumping spiders
Euophrys monadnock at Global Species Database of Salticidae (Araneae)
Euophrys monadnock at Salticidae: Diagnostic Drawings Library
Euophrys monadnock at Bugguide.net

Salticidae
Spiders of North America
Spiders described in 1891